Stefano Vukov (born 27 March 1987) is a Croatian tennis coach and former player. He has coached Women's Tennis Association (WTA) player Elena Rybakina since 2019.

Career

Vukov was born in the Croatian city of Rijeka in 1987 to a mother who worked as a dentist and a father who was a software engineer. He started playing tennis at age 12, but his family prioritized education, so he graduated from college while continuing to aspire to professional tennis. Vukov played mostly on the ITF Futures Circuit, reaching a career-high Association of Tennis Professionals (ATP) ranking of No. 1122 in 2007, and retired from playing in 2009. A couple years after that, he began professionally coaching girls at a tennis facility in Florida, working with future WTA Tour players such as Sachia Vickery, Renata Zarazúa, and Anhelina Kalinina.

In February 2019, Elena Rybakina, then ranked just within the WTA's top 200, hired Vukov to replace Moscow-based coach Andrei Chesnokov as her first traveling coach. Rybakina credited Vukov, known for his analytic expertise, with helping to improve her game; she rose quickly through the rankings, cracking the top 30 and winning her first two WTA Tour titles by early the next year. After Rybakina won her first major title at the 2022 Wimbledon Championships, Vukov followed through on a two-year-old bet to get a tattoo of Rybakina's name if she ever won Wimbledon.

Vukov's "frantic and intense" style of on-court coaching of the typically stoical Rybakina has drawn attention. Vukov has said he "know[s] very well how to get Elena angry" to energize her and how to help her tactically focus, with a mutual understanding "to push her even when she does not want to be pushed", but recognizes that to outsiders it can seem like "too much". During Rybakina's run at the 2022 Australian Open, where she eventually lost in the final to Aryna Sabalenka, Vukov attracted public criticism for his seemingly harsh midmatch comments from the player's box. In a social media post, Rybakina defended Vukov, saying that their relationship remains positive and that she appreciates his input.

References

External links

1987 births
Living people
Sportspeople from Rijeka
Croatian tennis players
Croatian tennis coaches